Hami is a prefecture-level city in Xinjiang, China.

Hami may also refer to:

Yizhou District, Hami, formerly Hami county-level city, now the central district of Hami
Hami melon, a type of muskmelon grown in Hami
Hami Desert, Xinjiang, China
Hami, Iran, a village in South Khorasan Province
Hami, Yemen
Hami, Kagoshima, Japan
Hami, a type of archaeal pilus